Pygmalion is a musical ensemble created in 2006 by Raphaël Pichon during his studies at the Paris Conservatoire. It consists of a choir and an instrumental ensemble. It specialises in baroque repertoire (played on period instruments).

Discography
Originally Pygmalion recorded for Alpha, a French early music label record label.
Since 2014 the ensemble has recorded for Harmonia Mundi. 

As well as recording French repertory, Pygmalion has released notable versions of music by Johann Sebastian Bach:
mass compositions (Missæ Breves, BWV 234 and 235). Alpha 2008. Diapason d'Or (French award)
Köthener Trauermusik, BWV 244a (a "lost" Bach cantata). Harmonia Mundi 2014. 
the Bach motets. Harmonia Mundi 2020. Opus Klassik (German award)

References

External links
 Official website

Musical groups established in 2006